Kapsiki (Ka-Tsepkye) is a people living on both sides of the border between North Cameroon and Northeast Nigeria.  They are called Kapsiki in Cameroon, and Kamwe (Higi) in Nigeria. Together they amount to about 120,000 people. Their language, Psekiye or Kamwe, consists of eleven dialects including Nkafa, Sina, Ghye, Humsi, Dakwa and Tilli and belongs to the Chadic language family.

In Cameroon, the Kapsiki live on a plateau in the Far North Province in the center of the Mandara Mountains. They are considered one of Cameroon's Kirdi (pagan) ethnic groups due to their resistance to Islamisation during the Fulani jihad of Modibo Adama and Hama Yaji.

In Nigeria, the Kamwe live on the slopes of the mountains and the western plain. The Kapsiki have been living in this area for five centuries, long before the great slave hunts of the 19th century, but by this isolated habitat they have been able to maintain themselves against the Fulbe. This also applies to the other peoples of Mandara region, such as the Mafa, Mofu, Podoko Guisiga, or Daba.

The mountain region has a kaleidoscope of local cultures. The Kapsiki live in villages of 2000-6000 people, and subsist on livestock farming, agriculture and - in the village of Rumsiki in particular - on tourism.

The Malima Project  has been helping Kapsiki populations in Cameroon with educational projects aimed at primary schooling. The Malima Project has created a documentary and organized events  to promote its educational activities in the area.

References
 DeLancey, Mark W., and Mark Dike DeLancey (2000): Historical Dictionary of the Republic of Cameroon (3rd ed.). Lanham, Maryland: The Scarecrow Press.
 Van Beek, Walter E.A. (2012): The Dancing Dead. Ritual and Religion among the Kapsiki/Higi of North Cameroon and Northeast Nigeria, Oxford University Press.
 Van Beek, Walter E.A. (2013): Crab divination among the Kapsiki/Higi of North Cameroon and northeastern Nigeria' in Reviewing reality : dynamics of African divination'' Walter E.A. van Beek & Philip M. Peek, eds. Berlijn: LIT Verlag, p. 185-209.
Kwache, Iliya Yame (2016):  Kamwe People of Northern Nigeria: Origin, History and Culture. Prudent Universal Press and Publishing Company Ltd Kaduna Nigeria

Specific

Ethnic groups in Cameroon